Lecanorineae are a suborder of pezizomycetes fungi, commonly known as the lichens and rostrate asci.

Families

Aphanopsidaceae 
Byssolomataceae 
Carbonicolaceae 
Catillariaceae 
Cetradoniaceae 
Cladoniaceae 
Crocyniaceae 
Gypsoplacaceae 
Haematommataceae 
Lecanoraceae 
Malmideaceae 
Micareaceae 
Parmeliaceae 
Porpidiaceae 
Psilolechiaceae 
Psoraceae 
Ramalinaceae 
Ramboldiaceae 
Sphaerophoraceae 
Squamarinaceae 
Stereocaulaceae 
Tephromelataceae 

Lecanorineae incertae sedis
Lichenosticta 
Schistophoron

References
C.J. Alexopolous, Charles W. Mims, M. Blackwell, Introductory Mycology, 4th ed. (John Wiley and Sons, Hoboken NJ, 2004)  

Lecanorales
Lichens